In New South Wales, Highway 1 is a  long route that crosses the state, from the Queensland/New South Wales border near Tweed Heads to the Victorian border near Timbillica. Highway 1 continues around the rest of Australia, joining all mainland state capitals, and connecting major centres in Tasmania.

With the entire route passing close to the coast, for many New South Wales residents Highway 1 is synonymous with summer holiday road trips. Parts of the route are also busy intercity or commuter routes.

While the route is defined by its designation of "1", with today's alphanumeric route numbering system the route consists of eight sections, alternating between the M1 designation (for motorway grade sections) and the A1 designation (for other sections).

History

Highway 1 was created as part of the National Route Numbering system, adopted in 1955. The route was compiled from an existing network of state and local roads and tracks.

Route numbering
When Highway 1 was declared in 1955, the entire route carried the National Route 1 shield. In 1974, the Sydney-Newcastle Freeway section was declared part of the National Highway, and the route marker was subsequently updated to National Highway 1 for this section

In 1993, the route numbering was further complicated with the introduction of the Metroad numbering system within the  metro area.

In 2013, alphanumeric route numbering was introduced to New South Wales, and all sections of Highway 1 were changed to carry either the M1 or A1 designation, depending on the grade of the road. As of 2013, large sections of the Pacific Highway are actually of motorway standard, despite still carrying the A1 designation. The government has explained this is to avoid frequent changes in route designation, with plans to update the designation to M1 over time as large sections of road are brought to motorway standard.

Route description

Highway 1 travels multiple named roads on its journey from the Queensland to the Victorian border:
 Pacific Motorway (Brisbane to )
/ Pacific Highway ( to )
 New England Highway ( to )
 John Renshaw Drive
 Pacific Motorway ( to )
 Pacific Highway ( to )
 Gore Hill Freeway ( to )
 Warringah Freeway ( to )
 Sydney Harbour Tunnel ( to )
 Cahill Expressway ( to )
 Eastern Distributor ( to )
 Southern Cross Drive ( to )
 General Holmes Drive ( to )
 General Holmes Drive ( to )
 The Grand Parade ( to )
 President Avenue ( to )
 Princes Highway ( to )
 Acacia Road ( to )
 Princes Highway ( to )
 Princes Motorway ( to )
 Princes Highway ( to )
 Princes Highway ( to Timbillica)

Major intersections
Highway 1 intersects the following major roads in New South Wales:
 Bruxner Highway
 Big River Way
 Oxley Highway
 New England Highway
 Hunter Expressway
 Newcastle Link Road
 Central Coast Highway
 Mona Vale Road/Ryde Road (A3)
 Military Road (A8)
 Bradfield Highway (A4)
 M5 East Freeway (M5)
 King Georges Road (A3)
 Heathcote Road (A6)
 Illawarra Highway (A48)
 Kings Highway
 Snowy Mountains Highway

References

See also

 Highway 1 (Northern Territory)
 Highway 1 (Queensland)
 Highway 1 (South Australia)
 Highway 1 (Tasmania)
 Highway 1 (Victoria)
 Highway 1 (Western Australia)

Highways in New South Wales